"Small Stuff" is a song recorded by the American country music group Alabama. It was released in October 1999 as the second single from the album Twentieth Century. The song reached #24 on the Billboard Hot Country Singles & Tracks chart.  The song was written by Mark Collie, Hillary Kanter and Even Stevens.

Chart performance

References

1999 singles
1999 songs
Alabama (American band) songs
Songs written by Mark Collie
Songs written by Even Stevens (songwriter)
Song recordings produced by Don Cook
RCA Records singles